Atmospheric temperature is a measure of temperature at different levels of the Earth's atmosphere. It is governed by many factors, including incoming solar radiation, humidity and altitude. When discussing surface air temperature, the annual atmospheric temperature range at any geographical location depends largely upon the type of biome, as measured by the Köppen climate classification

Temperature versus altitude

Temperature varies greatly at different heights relative to Earth's surface and this variation in temperature characterizes the four layers that exist in the atmosphere. These layers include the troposphere, stratosphere, mesosphere, and thermosphere.

The troposphere is the lowest of the four layers, extending from the surface of the Earth to about  into the atmosphere where the tropopause (the boundary between the troposphere stratosphere) is located. The width of the troposphere can vary depending on latitude, for example, the troposphere is thicker in the tropics (about ) because the tropics are generally warmer, and thinner at the poles (about ) because the poles are colder. Temperatures in the atmosphere decrease with height at an average rate of  6,5°C (11,7 °F) per kilometer. Because the troposphere experiences its warmest temperatures closer to Earth's surface, there is great vertical movement of heat and water vapour, causing turbulence. This turbulence, in conjunction with the presence of water vapour, is the reason that weather occurs within the troposphere.

Following the tropopause is the stratosphere. This happening is referred to as an inversion and It is because of this inversion that the stratosphere is not characterised as turbulent. The stratosphere receives its warmth from the sun and the ozone layer which absorbs ultraviolet radiation.

Temperatures in the mesosphere decrease with altitude and are in fact the coldest in the Earth's atmosphere This decrease in temperature can be attributed to the diminishing radiation received from the Sun, after most of it has already been absorbed by the thermosphere.

The fourth layer of the atmosphere is known as the thermosphere which extends from the mesopause to the 'top' of the collisional atmosphere. Some of the warmest temperatures can be found in the thermosphere, due to its reception of strong ionizing radiation at the level of the Van Allen radiation belt.

Temperature range 
The variation in temperature that occurs from the highs of the day to the cool of nights is called diurnal temperature variation. Temperature ranges can also be based on periods of a month, or a year.

The size of ground-level atmospheric temperature ranges depends on several factors, such as:

 The average temperature
 The average humidity
 The regime of winds (intensity, duration, variation, temperature, etc.)
 The proximity to large bodies of water, such as the sea

The figure at below-left shows an example of monthly temperatures recorded at one of such locations, the city of Campinas, state of São Paulo, Brazil, which lies approximately 60 km north of the Capricorn line (latitude of 22 degrees). Average yearly temperature is 22.4 degrees Celsius, ranging from an average minimum of 12.2 degrees to a maximum of 29.9 degrees. The average temperature range is 11.4 degrees. Variability along the year is small (standard deviation of 2.31 for the maximum monthly average and 4.11 for the minimum). It is easy to see in the graph another typical phenomenon of temperature ranges, which is its increase during winter (lower average air temperature).

In Campinas, for example, the daily temperature range in July (the coolest month of the year) may vary between typically 10 and 24 degrees Celsius (range of 14), while in January, it may range between 20 and 30 degrees Celsius (range of 10).

The effect of latitude, tropical climate, constant gentle wind and sea-side locations show smaller average temperature ranges, smaller variations of temperature, and a higher average temperature (second graph, taken for the same period as Campinas, at Aracaju, capital of the state of Sergipe, also in Brazil, at a latitude of 10 degrees, nearer to the Equator). Average maximum yearly temperature is 28.7 degrees Celsius and average minimum is 21.9. The average temperature range is 5.7 degrees only. Temperature variation along the year in Aracaju is very damped (standard deviation of 1.93 for the maximum temperature and 2.72 for the minimum temperature).

Significance 

A location which combines an average temperature of 19 degrees Celsius, 60% average humidity and a temperature range of about 10 degrees Celsius around the average temperature (yearly temperature variation) is considered ideal in terms of comfort for the human species. Most of the places with these characteristics are located in the transition between temperate and tropical climates, approximately around the tropics, particularly in the Southern hemisphere (the tropic of Capricorn).

Lifted minimum temperature

The minimum temperature on calm, clear nights has been observed to occur not on the ground, but rather a few tens of centimeters above the ground.  The lowest temperature layer is called Ramdas layer after L. A. Ramdas, who first reported this phenomenon in 1932 based on observations at different screen heights at six meteorological centers across India.  The phenomenon is attributed to the interaction of thermal radiation effects on atmospheric aerosols and convection transfer close to the ground.

Global temperature

The concept of a global temperature is commonly used in climatology, and denotes the average temperature of the Earth based on surface, near-surface or tropospheric measurements. These temperature records and measurements are typically acquired using the satellite or ground instrumental temperature measurements, then usually compiled using a database or computer model. Long-term global temperatures in paleoclimate are discerned using proxy data.

See also
 Apparent temperature
 Atmospheric thermodynamics
 Brightness temperature
 Emissivity of Earth's atmosphere
 Equivalent temperature
 Freezing air temperature
Instrumental temperature record
 Lapse rate
 Outside air temperature, in aviation
 Room temperature
 Total air temperature, in aviation

References

Atmospheric thermodynamics
Atmospheric circulation